"Odoro yo Honey" is Missile Innovation's debut single under the avex trax (tearbridge records) label. The single was released on February 1, 2006, and came in one format.

Overview
"Odoro yo Honey" is Missile Innovation's debut single after Ryo Owatari's splitting up from Do As Infinity. The single failed to chart in the Daily Top 20 on the Japanese Oricon Charts, and even failed to chart in the Weekly Top 50.

The main song is described by many websites as a perfect song for Valentine's Day, which is fitting, since it was released only 13 days before the holiday.

Cover
The cover of this single is a parody of the cover of Cream's final album, Goodbye.

Track listing
 "" (Ryo Owatari) - 4:27
 "" (Takashi Matsumoto, Karuho Kureta) - 3:25

Personnel
 Ryo Owatari - vocals & guitars
 Hisayoshi Hayashi - drums & Chorus
 Yoshiyasu Hayashi - bass & Chorus
 Masato Minagawa - keyboards
 Yasuyuki Oguro - guitar technician

Production
 A&R - Miki Kaneko
 Art direction & Design - Nao Sasaki
 Photographer - Takaaki Henmi
 Stylist - Tatsuhiko Marumoto
 Hair & Make - Ayano Hashimoto
 General Producer - Hiroaki Ito
 Executive Producer - Masato "max" Matsuura & Ryuhei Chiba

Missile Innovation songs
2006 singles
Songs written by Ryo Owatari
2006 songs